The Italian Market is the popular name for the South 9th Street Curb Market, an area of South Philadelphia featuring awning covered sidewalks, curb carts, grocery shops, cafes, restaurants, bakeries, cheese shops, butcher shops, etc., many with an Italian influence. The historical heart of the market is the area of 9th Street between Christian Street and Washington Avenue, the commercial district chartered in 1915, the South Ninth Street Business Men's Association, covered the area between Catharine to Federal and Eighth to Tenth streets, and the market is now generally considered to extend from Fitzwater Street at the north to Wharton Street at the south. The term Italian Market is also used to generally describe the surrounding neighborhood between South Street to the North and Wharton Street to the South running a few blocks to the east and west of 9th street.

Although it is considered the social and commercial heart of the Philadelphia Italian community, the Ninth Street Market also contained many Jewish businesses in its inception. In recent years, an influx of immigrants from Latin America, mainly from Mexico and to a lesser degree from Central American countries like Guatemala and El Salvador, has significantly contributed to the Italian Market area, and, in the southern Italian Market in particular, the Market is now also home to many stores and restaurants catering to South Philadelphia's Hispanic population in addition to the Italian-American community.

History

9th Street, frequently referred to simply as The Italian Market, has its origins as a marketplace in the late 19th and early 20th centuries. The area, outside the original boundaries of William Penn's planned city, was an area for immigrants to settle. Italians began to move into the area around 1884, when Antonio Palumbo began receiving Italian immigrants into his boardinghouse. Shops along 9th Street opened up shortly after to cater to the new Italian community and have remained in the area to this day, with many of the present vendors tracing the founding of their businesses back to the first decade of the 20th century.

The area continues to attract new immigrants as a significant number of Vietnamese, Korean, Chinese and Mexican-run businesses have joined the traditional Italian shops in the market. Many new Mexican stores have opened up around the market. Many Latino immigrants also work in the market.

The market also plays host to the annual Italian Market Festival with music, activities, and food.

One of several curb markets established in the early 20th century offering fresh produce and a variety of ethnic specialty foods, it has evolved into a popular Philadelphia icon. On October 12, 2007, the Market was honored by the dedication of a Pennsylvania State Historical Marker as the "South 9th Street Curb Market" at the NE corner of 9th and Christian Streets.

An unofficial historical marker was erected just in front of the since-removed Frank Rizzo mural at 9th & Montrose Sts in 2008. The marker, entitled "The Italian Market," briefly explains about the Italian market area forming a business association in the early 1900s. The officers of the association were of central and southern Italian and eastern Sicilian heritages. The other members of the association were of northern and eastern European, Lebanese and Asian heritages.

Today and Pop Culture References
The outdoor market features bright colorful metal awnings covering the sidewalks where vendors of fruit, vegetables, fish, and housewares conduct business year-round. Ground floor shops in traditional Philadelphia rowhouses line the street. Many owners had originally lived above their shops, and many still do.

The market is open year-round, generally from 9 am to 5 pm, though outdoor stands and cafes often open earlier, and restaurants serve patrons late into the evening. Many businesses are open until lunchtime on Sunday, and closed Monday.

The market also plays a role in the culture of Philadelphia, often being included in cultural depictions of the city. For example, The Italian Market was featured in Rocky and Rocky II, most notably in the running/training montage where a vendor tosses the boxer an orange. The television series Hack also filmed several episodes that featured the Italian Market, and it was also featured on a season 5 episode of the television show It's Always Sunny in Philadelphia.

As Philadelphia has gentrified, so has the Italian Market. Outdoor seating at cozy cafes, upscale gift stores and gourmet shops are thriving among the market's traditional produce vendors, specialty butchers, and cheese mongers.

Gallery

See also

 Pat's King of Steaks
 Geno's Steaks
 History of the Italian Americans in Philadelphia
 Frank Palumbo and Palumbo's
 Little Saigon, Philadelphia, a neighborhood that it is intertwined with.
 Washington Avenue Historic District (Philadelphia, Pennsylvania)

References

Further reading
Liberati, Maria. PHILADELPHIA'S ITALIAN MARKET TOUR - A Self-guided Pictorial Walking Tour Publication date: January 21, 2012 (Visual Travel Tours Book 107) [Kindle Edition]  ASIN B0070N2FNK

External links

 of the South 9th Street Italian Market
The Ninth Street Market and South Philadelphia: Personal Connections, Particular Views, Past Times, and Embodied Places by Joan Saverino Historical Society of Pennsylvania
Mapping the Ninth Street Market by Shimrit Keddem of Pennsylvania Historical Society
American Coal and Ice Company Ice House by Historical Society of Pennsylvania
Different Paths, One Market: Awnings and Interviews by City of Philadelphia Mural Arts Program and The Historical Society of Pennsylvania
Anthony's Italian Coffee and Chocolate House by Historical Society of Pennsylvania
Dan Khang Nha Trang, Inc. Chinese Apothecary by Historical Society of Pennsylvania
Grassia's Italian Market Spice Company by Historical Society of Pennsylvania
Fante's Kitchen Shop by Nick Fante
Giordano's Produce by Historical Society of Pennsylvania
D'Angelo Bros. Meat Market by Melissa Mandell of Historical Society of Pennsylvania
Cannuli's Quality Meats & Poultry by Historical Society of Pennsylvania
Lupita's Grocery by Historical Society of Pennsylvania
Connie's Ric-Rac - A Dream Pursued, A Block Saved by Mariel Waloff Historical Society of Pennsylvania
Fante-Leone Public Pool by Historical Society of Pennsylvania

Italian-American culture in Philadelphia
Little Italys in the United States
Neighborhoods in Philadelphia
Cuisine of Philadelphia
Economy of Philadelphia
Food markets in the United States
Tourist attractions in Philadelphia
Italian-American cuisine
South Philadelphia